Gol Malek may refer to:
 Gol Malek, Hormozgan
 Gol Malek, Kerman